Roger Soame Jenyns (24 April 1904 – 14 October 1976), who usually wrote his name simply as
Soame Jenyns was a British art historian, known as an expert on East Asian ceramics.

The eldest son of Roger William Bulwer Jenyns (1858 – 1936), J.P., of Bottisham Hall, Bottisham, Cambridgeshire, by his wife Winifred Pike, daughter of Arthur Pease, M.P., of Hummersknott, Darlington, Roger Soame Jenyns was educated at Eton and at Magdalene College, Cambridge (B.A. 1926). In 1926 he joined the Hong Kong Civil Service.
In Hong Kong, he became one of the valuable contributors to the newly established journal, The Hong Kong Naturalist. His articles would often touch on the cultural role of South China's animals and plants.

In 1931, Jenyns left Hong Kong for England, to take up a job at the British Museum,  where he served as the Assistant Keeper of Oriental Antiquities until 1967.
In 1935 he published a well-received book on Chinese painting; later on, he  authored several books on Chinese ceramics and jades in which he described many items from the museum's collection.

In 1936, Roger Soame Jenyns inherited the Bottisham Hall estate from his father. Two centuries earlier this had been owned by the writer and politician Soame Jenyns, on whose death it was inherited by his first cousin twice removed, Canon George Leonard Jenyns, great-great-grandfather of Roger Soame Jenyns.

Family
On 24 April 1941, Soame Jenyns married Anne Thomson, dau. of Richard Berridge, D.L., J.P., of Screebe, County Galway. They had two sons.

Books by Soame Jenyns
 A Background to Chinese Painting by Soame Jenyns: with a Preface for Collectors by W. W. Winkworth; London, Sidgwick & Jackson, Ltd., 1935.

 Later Chinese Porcelain: The Ch’ing Dynasty (1644-1912) (London, 1954).; later edition: 
  (First edition appeared in 1950)

References

1904 births
1976 deaths
British art historians
British expatriates in Hong Kong
British science writers 
People educated at Eton College
Alumni of Magdalene College, Cambridge
Antiques experts
20th-century British historians
People from Bottisham